The Apostolic Vicariate of Izabal is a Latin Church ecclesiastical territory or apostolic vicariate of the Catholic Church in eastern Guatemala's Izabal Department. It is exempt directly to the Holy See and not part of any ecclesiastical province.

Its cathedral is Catedral Inmaculada Concepción de María, in the see of Puerto Barrios.

History 
It was erected 30 April 1968, as the "Apostolic Administration of Izabal", on territory split off from the Diocese of Zacapa. It was elevated as an apostolic vicariate on 12 March 1988.

Episcopal ordinaries
Apostolic Administrators of Izabal
 Gerardo Humberto Flores Reyes (1969.05.09 – 1977.10.07), previously Auxiliary Bishop of Quetzaltenango, Los Altos (Guatemala) (1966.07.26 – 1969.05.09), Titular Bishop of Nova Cæsaris (1966.07.26 – 1977.10.07); later Bishop of Vera Paz (Guatemala) (1977.10.07 – 2001.02.22), President of Episcopal Conference of Guatemala (1992–1994)
 Luis María Estrada Paetau, Dominican Order (O.P.) (1977.10.27 – 1988.03.12 see below)
 
Apostolic Vicars of Izabal
 Luis María Estrada Paetau, Dominican Order (O.P.) (see above 1977.10.27 – 1988.03.12), Titular Bishop of Regiæ (1977.10.27 – 2011.03.25); previously Apostolic Administrator of El Petén (Guatemala) (1970.11.30 – emeritate 1977.10.27)
 Gabriel Peñate Rodríguez  (2004.05.21 – 2011.07.26 resignation), Titular Bishop of Succuba (2004.05.21 – ...)
''Apostolic administrator Mario Enrique Ríos Montt, Lazarists (C.M.) (2011.07.26 – 2013.02.09), Titular Bishop of Tiguala (1974.07.13 – ...), previously Bishop-Prelate of the then Territorial Prelature of Escuintla (Guatemala) (1974.07.13 – 1984.03.03) & Auxiliary Bishop of Guatemala (Guatemala) (1987.01.24 – 2010.10.02)
 Domingo Buezo Leiva (2013.02.09 – ...), also Secretary General of Episcopal Conference of Guatemala (2012.03? – ...), Titular Bishop of Dardanus (2013.02.09 – ...)

References

External links
 GigaCatholic

Apostolic vicariates
Roman Catholic dioceses in Guatemala
Christian organizations established in 1968
1968 establishments in North America
Roman Catholic dioceses and prelatures established in the 20th century